All Fall Down is the third studio album by English post-punk band The Sound, recorded from March to August 1982 and released in November 1982 on record label WEA.

After being pressured by their record label to release a more commercially successful album, since their previous records failed to attract the attention of the public, The Sound rebelled and recorded All Fall Down, which has been called "distinctly uncommercial".

The album was poorly received by critics and led to the termination of The Sound's contract with WEA. No singles were released from the album.

Background 
On the album, Andy Kellman of AllMusic opined, "there was no attempt at making a hit. [...] The Sound responded to label demands and simmering internal pressures with a record that challenged devout fans as well." Drummer Mike Dudley said of the album:

We thought [the label wasn't] giving us the support that we were due and that if they really wanted a commercial album, they had got to put plenty of money behind it, which with both Jeopardy and From the Lions Mouth they hadn't really done [...] So when they turned around and said, 'The solution is for you to write more commercial songs', we thought, 'Fuck you', and went ahead and produced All Fall Down.

Release 
All Fall Down was released in 23 October 1982. No singles were released from the album. It failed to chart in the UK and received a negative response from critics. WEA were displeased with the album and decided not to promote it, and The Sound's contract with them was terminated.

Reception 

All Fall Down received a negative critical reception upon its release. Johnny Waller of Sounds panned the album, writing, "This is the album The Sound should never have made, didn't need to make, could have made in their sleep [...] [it] adds virtually nothing to the minimalist passion of Jeopardy and the following, more impressively structured From the Lions Mouth and, as such, is virtually worthless", concluding the review with "Look in the mirror, Adrian, before you all fall down".

A favourable review came from Trouser Press, which said, "The black, clashing music makes the challenging LP an acquired taste, an ambitious, admirable exploration of the downside". In his retrospective review of the album, Peter Parrish of Stylus was very positive, opining that "All Fall Down can make a realistic claim to being their best [album]".

Track listing

Personnel 
The Sound
 Adrian Borland – vocals, guitar, production
 Graham Green – bass guitar, sound effects, drum machine programming, percussion, production
 Max Mayers – keyboards, production
 Mike Dudley – drums, percussion, production

Additional personnel
 Manor Choir – backing vocals on "All Fall Down"
 Craig Milliner – engineering
 Flood – engineering
 Steve Prestage – engineering
 Bill Smith – sleeve artwork design
 Andrew Douglas – sleeve photography
 Nick Robbins – production

References

External links 
 

The Sound (band) albums
1982 albums
Albums recorded at Trident Studios